The Battle of the Eureka Stockade was fought in Ballarat, Victoria, on 3 December 1854, between gold miners and the colonial forces of Australia. It was the culmination of the 1851-1854 Eureka Rebellion during the Victorian gold rush. The fighting resulted in an official total of 27 deaths and many injuries, the majority of casualties being rebels. The miners had various grievances, chiefly the cost of mining permits and the officious way the system was enforced.

Background

The Port Phillip District was partitioned on 1 July 1851, as Victoria gained autonomy within the British Empire after a decade of de facto independence from New South Wales. Approval of the Victorian constitution by the Imperial parliament was pending, with an election held for a provisional legislative council consisting of 20 elected and ten appointed members subject to property-based franchise and membership requirements.

Gold prospectors were offered 200 guineas for making discoveries within  of Melbourne. In August 1851, the news was received worldwide that, on top of several earlier finds, Thomas Hiscock, outside of Buninyong in central Victoria, had found still more deposits. As gold fever took hold, the colony's population increased from 77,000 in 1851 to 198,496 in 1853. Among this number was "a heavy sprinkling of ex-convicts, gamblers, thieves, rogues and vagabonds of all kinds." The local authorities soon found themselves with fewer police officers and lacking the infrastructure needed to support the expansion of the mining industry. The number of public servants, factory and farm workers leaving for the goldfields to seek their fortune led to a chronic labour shortage that needed to be resolved. The response was a universal mining tax based on time stayed, rather than what was seen as the more equitable option, being an export duty levied only on gold found, meaning it was always designed to make life unprofitable for most prospectors. Licence inspections, known as "digger hunts," were treated as recreation and carried out by mounted officials who would receive a fifty per cent commission from any fines imposed. Many recruits were former prisoners from Tasmania and prone to brutal means, having been sentenced to serve in the military. Miners were often arrested for not carrying licences on their person because of the typically wet and dirty conditions in the mines, then subjected to such indignities as being chained to trees and logs overnight.

In the years leading up to the Eureka Stockade, several mass public meetings were held to address the miner's grievances. The Bendigo Petition received over 5,000 signatures and was presented to Lieutenant-Governor Charles La Trobe by a miner's delegation in August 1853. There were also delegations received by the Ballarat gold commissioner Robert William Rede and La Trobe's successor Charles Hotham in October and November 1854. However, the ever-present "physical force" faction of the mining tax protest movement would gain the ascendancy over those who advocated "moral force," including John Basson Humffray, after a judicial enquiry into the murder of miner James Scobie outside the Eureka Hotel. There was no finding of guilt regarding the owner James Bently, who was deeply suspected of involvement, with the case being presided over by a police magistrate accused of having a conflict of interest. Then there was an uproar over the arrest of Catholic Father Smyth's disabled Armenian servant Johannes Gregorious. He was subjected to police brutality and false arrest for licence evasion even though it was revealed he was exempt from the requirement. Gregorious was instead convicted of assaulting a constable and fined 5 pounds despite the court hearing testimony to the contrary. Eventually, the discontent would begin to spiral out of control when a mob of many thousands of aggrieved miners put the Eureka Hotel to the torch on 17 October 1854. On 28 November, there was a skirmish as the approaching 12th Regiment (East Suffolk) had their wagon train looted in the vicinity of the Eureka lead, where the rebels ultimately made their last stand. The next day, the Eureka Flag appeared on the platform for the first time, and mining licences were burnt at the final fiery mass meeting of the Ballarat Reform League – the miner's lobby. The league's founding charter proclaims that "it is the inalienable right of every citizen to have a voice in making the laws he is called upon to obey" and "taxation without representation is tyranny," in the language of the United States Declaration of Independence. On 30 November, there was further rioting where missiles were once again directed at military and law enforcement by the protesting miners who had henceforth refused to cooperate with licence inspections en masse. That afternoon there was a paramilitary display on Bakery Hill. The oath-swearing ceremony took place as the military companies formed were gathered around the Eureka Flag. In the preceding weeks, the men of violence had already been aiming musket balls at the barely fortified government camp during the night.

The rebels, under their commander-in-chief Peter Lalor, who had left Ireland for the goldfields of Australia, were led down the road from Bakery Hill to the ill-fated Eureka Stockade. It was a crude "higgledy piggledy" battlement erected between 30 November and 2 December that consisted of diagonal spikes and overturned horse carts. In the ensuing battle that left at least 22 rebels and seven soldiers and police dead, the stockade was besieged and captured by the advancing government forces. They briefly wavered, with the 40th Regiment (2nd Somersetshire) having to be rallied amid a short, sharp exchange of ranged fire lasting around 15 minutes at dawn on Sunday, 3 December. The Victorian police contingent led the way over the top as the forlorn hope in a bayonet charge.

Fortification of the Eureka lead

After the oath swearing ceremony, about 1,000 rebels marched in double file from Bakery Hill to the Eureka lead behind the Eureka Flag being carried by Henry Ross, where construction of the stockade took place between 30 November and 2 December. The stockade itself was a ramshackle affair described in Carboni's 1855 memoirs as "higgledy piggledy." There were existing mines within the stockade, and it consisted of diagonal wooden spikes made from materials including pit props and overturned horse carts. It encompassed an area said to be one acre; however, that is difficult to reconcile with other estimates that have the dimensions of the stockade as being around  x .

According to Lalor, the stockade "was nothing more than an enclosure to keep our own men together, and was never erected with an eye to military defence." However, Peter FitzSimons asserts that Lalor may have downplayed the fact that the Eureka Stockade may have been intended as something of a fortress at a time when "it was very much in his interests" to do so. The construction work was overseen by Vern, who had apparently received instruction in military methods. John Lynch wrote that his "military learning comprehended the whole system of warfare ... fortification was his strong point." Les Blake has noted how other descriptions of the stockade "rather contradicted" Lalor's recollection of it being a simple fence after the fall of the stockade. Testimony was heard at the high treason trials for the Eureka rebels that the stockade was four to seven feet high in places and was unable to be negotiated on horseback without being reduced.

Hotham feared that the "network of rabbit burrows" on the goldfields would prove readily defensible as his forces "on the rough pot-holed ground would be unable to advance in regular formation and would be picked off easily by snipers," considerations that were part of the reasoning behind the decision to move into position in the early morning for a surprise attack. Carboni details the rebel dispositions along: "The shepherds' holes inside the lower part of the stockade had been turned into rifle-pits, and were now occupied by Californians of the I.C. Rangers' Brigade, some twenty or thirty in all, who had kept watch at the 'outposts' during the night."

However, the location of the stockade has been described as "appalling from a defensive point of view," as it was situated on "a gentle slope, which exposed a sizeable portion of its interior to fire from nearby high ground." A detachment of 800 men, which included "two field pieces and two howitzers" under the commander in chief of the British forces in Australia, Major General Sir Robert Nickle, who had also seen action during the 1798 Irish rebellion, would arrive after the insurgency had been put down.

At 4 am on the morning of 1 December, the rebels were observed to be massing on Bakery Hill, but a government raiding party found the area vacated. Again Rede ordered the riot act read to a mob that had gathered around Bath's Hotel, with mounted police breaking up the unlawful assembly. Raffaello Carboni, George Black and Father Smyth meet with Commissioner Rede to present a peace proposal. Rede is suspicious of the chartist undercurrent of the anti-mining tax movement and rejects the proposals as being the way forward.

The rebels sent out scouts and established picket lines in order to have advance warning of Rede's movements. Messengers were dispatched to other mining settlements, including Bendigo and Creswick, requesting reinforcements for the Eureka Stockade. The "moral force" faction, led by Humffray, withdrew from the protest movement the previous day as the men of violence moved into the ascendancy. The rebels continued to fortify their position as 300-400 men arrived from Creswick's Creek to join the struggle. Carboni recalls they were: "dirty and ragged, and proved the greatest nuisance. One of them, Michael Tuohy, behaved valiantly." The arrival of these reinforcements required the dispatch of foraging parties, leaving a garrison of around 200 men behind. Teddy Shanahan, a merchant whose store on the Eureka lead had been engulfed by the stockade, said the rebels immediately became very short on food, drink, and accommodation and that by the evening before the battle:

Vinegar Hill blunder: Irish dimension factors in dwindling numbers at stockade

The Argus newspaper of 4 December 1854 reported that the Union Jack "had" to be hoisted underneath the Eureka Flag at the stockade and that both flags were in possession of the foot police. Peter FitzSimons has questioned whether this contemporaneous report of the otherwise unaccounted-for Union Jack known as the Eureka Jack being present is accurate. Among those willing to credit the first report of the battle as being true and correct it has been theorised that the hoisting of a Union Jack at the stockade was possibly an 11th-hour response to the divided loyalties among the heterogeneous rebel force which was in the process of melting away. At one point up to 1,500 of 17,280 men in Ballarat were garrisoning the stockade, with as few as 120 taking part in the battle. Lalor's choice of password for the night of 2 December – "Vinegar Hill" – causing support for the rebellion to fall away among those who were otherwise disposed to resist the military, as word spread that the question of Irish home rule had become involved. One survivor of the battle stated that "the collapse of the rising at Ballarat may be regarded as mainly attributable to the password given by Lalor on the night before the assault." Asked by one of his subordinates for the "night pass," he gave "Vinegar Hill," the site of a battle during the 1798 Irish rebellion. The 1804 Castle Hill uprising, also known as the second battle of Vinegar Hill, was the site of a convict rebellion in the colony of New South Wales, involving mainly Irish transportees, some of whom were at Vinegar Hill. William Craig recalled that "Many at Ballaarat, who were disposed before that to resist the military, now quietly withdrew from the movement." In his memoirs, Lynch states: "On the afternoon of Saturday we had a force of seven hundred men on whom we thought we could rely." However, there was a false alarm from the picket line during the night. The subsequent roll call revealed there had been a sizable desertion that Lynch says "ought to have been seriously considered, but it was not." There were miners from Bendigo, Forrest Creek, and Creswick that marched to Ballarat to take part in the armed struggle. The latter contingent was said to number a thousand men, "but when the news circulated that Irish independence had crept into the movement, almost all turned back." FitzSimons points out that although the number of reinforcements converging on Ballarat was probably closer to 500, there is no doubt that as a result of the choice of password "the Stockade is denied many strong-armed men because of the feeling that the Irish have taken over." Withers states that:

It is certain that Irish-born people were strongly represented at the Eureka Stockade. Most of the rebels inside the stockade at the time of the battle were Irish, and the area where the defensive position was established was overwhelmingly populated by Irish miners. Blainey has advanced the view that the white cross of the Eureka Flag is "really an Irish cross rather than being [a] configuration of the Southern Cross."

There is another theory advanced by Gregory Blake, military historian and author of Eureka Stockade: A Ferocious and Bloody Battle, who concedes that two flags may have been flown on the day of the battle, as the miners were claiming to be defending their British rights.

In a signed contemporaneous affidavit dated 7 December 1854, Private Hugh King, who was at the battle serving with the 40th regiment, recalled that:

There was a further report in The Argus, 9 December 1854 edition, stating that Hugh King had given live testimony at the committal hearings for the Eureka rebels where he stated that the flag was found:

Blake leaves open the possibility that the flag being carried by the prisoner had been souvenired from the flag pole as the routed garrison was fleeing the stockade.

Departing detachment of Independent Californian Rangers leaves small garrison behind

Amid the rising number of rebels absent without leave throughout 2 December, a contingent of 200 Americans under James McGill arrived at 4 pm in the afternoon. Styled as "The Independent Californian Rangers' Revolver Brigade," they had horses and were equipped with sidearms and Mexican knives. In a fateful decision, McGill decided to take most of his two hundred Californian Rangers away from the stockade to intercept rumoured British reinforcements coming from Melbourne. Many Saturday night revellers within the rebel garrison went back to their own tents, assuming that the government camp would not attack on the Sabbath day. A small contingent of miners remained at the stockade overnight, which the spies reported to Rede. Common estimates for the size of the garrison at the time of the attack on 3 December range from 120-150 men.

According to Lalor's reckoning: "There were about 70 men possessing guns, 30 with pikes and 30 with pistols, but many had no more than one or two rounds of ammunition. Their coolness and bravery were admirable when it is considered that the odds were 3 to 1 against." Lalor's command was riddled with informants, and Rede was kept well advised of his movements, particularly through the work of government agents Henry Goodenough and Andrew Peters, who were embedded in the rebel garrison. Initially outnumbering the government camp considerably, Lalor had already devised a strategy where "if the government forces come to attack us, we should meet them on the Gravel Pits, and if compelled, we should retreat by the heights to the old Canadian Gully, and there we shall make our final stand." On being brought to battle that day, Lalor stated: "we would have retreated, but it was then too late."

On the eve of the battle, Father Smyth issued a plea for Catholics to down their arms and attend mass the following day.

Battle of the Eureka Stockade

Rede planned to send the combined military police formation of 276 men under the command of Captain John Thomas to attack the Eureka Stockade when the rebel garrison was observed to be at a low watermark. The troopers planned their attack on the stockade at dawn on a Sunday – the Christian day of worship, which would be a complete surprise. The soldiers and police marched off in silence at around 3:30 am Sunday morning after the troopers had drunk the traditional tot of rum. The British commander used bugle calls to coordinate his forces. The 40th regiment was to provide covering fire from one end, with mounted police covering the flanks. Enemy contact began at approximately 150 yards as the two columns of regular infantry, and the contingent of foot police moved into position.

According to Gregory Blake, the fighting in Ballarat on 3 December 1854 was not one-sided and full of indiscriminate murder by the colonial forces. In his memoirs, one of Lalor's captains, John Lynch, mentions "some sharp shooting." For at least 10 minutes, the rebels offered stiff resistance, with ranged fire coming from the Eureka Stockade garrison such that Thomas's best formation, the 40th regiment, wavered and had to be rallied. Blake says this is "stark evidence of the effectiveness of the defender's fire."

Contradictory accounts as to which side fired the first shot
Despite Lalor's insistence that his standing orders to all but the riflemen were to engage at a distance of fifteen feet and that "the military fired the first volley," it appears as if the first shots came from the Eureka Stockade garrison.

It has been claimed that Harry de Longville, who was on picket duty when the early morning shootout started and fired the first shot that was possibly intended to be a warning that the government forces were approaching. John O'Neill serving with the 40th regiment later recalled:

A magistrate by the name of Charles Hackett, said to have been generally well-liked by the miners in Ballarat, had accompanied Captain Thomas in the hopes of being able to read the riot act to the rebels; however, he had no time before the commencement of hostilities. He later gave sworn testimony that: "No shots were fired by the military or the police previous to shots being fired from the stockade."

Withers mentions an American rebel who claimed that:

Withers also published an account of one of Lalor's captains who stated: "The first shot was fired from our party, and the military answered by a volley at 100 paces distance."

Lynch would recall the course of the battle, saying:

In the area where the first contact was made, Carboni mentions:

Eureka Stockade garrison routed

The rebels eventually ran short of ammunition, and the government forces resumed their advance. The Victorian police contingent led the way over the top as the forlorn hope in a bayonet charge. Carboni says it was the pikemen who stood their ground that suffered the heaviest casualties, with Lalor ordering the musketeers to take refuge in the mine holes and crying out, "Pikemen, advance! Now for God's sake do your duty." There were twenty to thirty Californians at the stockade during the battle. After the rebel garrison had already begun to flee and all hope was lost a number of them gamely joined in the final melee bearing their trademark colt revolvers.

At the height of the battle, Lalor's left arm was shattered by a bullet which later required amputation. He was hidden under some slabs before being secreted out of Ballarat to hide as an outlaw with supporters. Golden Point local Dr Timothy Doyle performed the operation with Lalor quoted as saying, "Courage, courage, take it off!" It was Doyle who, in May 1853, exclaimed, "Eureka!" as he found the first nuggets of gold near where the stockade was located by which the locality became known.

Most of the killings happened after resistance by the rebels had slackened. The government forces destroyed tents and belongings without justification, bayoneting the wounded, and targeting non-combatants. The Commission of Inquiry would later find that:

Stories tell how women ran forward and threw themselves over the injured to prevent further indiscriminate killing. The second in command, Captain Pasley, threatened to shoot anyone involved in murdering prisoners. His valuable assistance was acknowledged in dispatches printed and laid before the Victorian Legislative Council. Captain Thomas finally ordered the bugler to sound the retreat, with around 120 rebels, some wounded, being rounded up and marched back to the government camp two kilometres away as prisoners. They were kept there in an overcrowded lock-up before being moved to a more spacious barn on Monday morning.

The Geelong Advertiser, 6 December 1854 edition, reported that:

Carboni recalls the casualties being piled onto horse carts with the rebel dead destined for a mass grave.

Eureka Flag seized by Constable John King

Called as a witness in the Eureka treason trials, George Webster, the chief assistant civil commissary and magistrate, testified that upon entering the stockade, the besieging forces "immediately made towards the flag, and the police pulled down the flag." Constable John King volunteered to take the Eureka Flag into police custody while the battle was still raging. The report of Captain John Thomas dated 14 December 1854 mentioned: "the fact of the Flag belonging to the Insurgents (which had been nailed to the flagstaff) being captured by Constable King of the Force." W. Bourke, a miner who lived about 250 yards from the Eureka Stockade, recalled that: "The police negotiated the wall of the Stockade on the south-west, and I then saw a policeman climb the flag-pole. When up about 12 or 14 feet the pole broke, and he came down with a run."

Carboni records the Eureka Flag was then trailed in an age-old celebration of victory, saying:

The Geelong Advertiser reported that the flag "was carried by in triumph to the Camp, waved about in the air, then pitched from one to another, thrown down and trampled on." The soldiers also danced around the flag on a pole that was "now a sadly tattered flag from which souvenir hunters had cut and torn pieces." The morning after the battle, "the policeman who captured the flag exhibited it to the curious and allowed such as so desired to tear off small portions of its ragged end to preserve as souvenirs."

The disputed first report of the attack on the Eureka Stockade also refers to a Union Jack being flown during the battle that was captured, along with the Eureka Flag, by the foot police.

Estimates of the death toll

Victorian death register
The exact numbers of deaths and injuries cannot be determined as, according to researcher Dorothy Wickham, many miners "fled to the surrounding bush, and it is likely a good many more died a lonely death or suffered the agony of their wounds, hidden from the authorities for fear of repercussions." On 20 June 1855, the registrar of Ballarat, William Thomas Pooley, entered 27 consecutive names into the Victorian death register. There are a least three dead buried outside of Ballarat. In total, it has been discovered that there are at least ten other individuals not found on the register but referred to elsewhere as having died. It has been thought that all the deaths at Eureka were men. However, the diary of Charles Evans describes a funeral cortege for a woman who was mercilessly butchered by a mounted trooper while pleading for the life of her husband during the battle. Her name and the fate and identity of her husband remain unknown.

Captain Thomas' list
Thomas' interim casualty report for the 12th and 40th regiments dated 3 December 1854 lists one killed in action, two died of wounds, and fourteen wounded. The Eureka Improvement Committee's 1923 honour roll contains the names of six soldiers. They are Captain Wise (DOW) along with Privates Webb (DOW), Roney (KIA), Wall (DOW), Boyle (DOW), and Hall (DOW). In addition, Private Denis Brian was killed in action on 3 December 1854, and Private James Hammond died of wounds after the battle en route to Geelong. There is also the case of Captain George Richard Littlehales, who, according to the 12th regiment's muster list, "Died 12 February 1855 at Ballarat Camp." However, he was buried in the same enclosure as Privates Webb and Boyle, who died of wounds sustained in the battle. Littlehales' grave initially had a wooden monument. It was replaced by a headstone in the 1880s after the soldiers' memorial was erected. In Christ Church Cathedral, Ballarat, there is a large font that bears the inscriptions "by his loving parents" and "in memory of G.R. Littlehales." At the Winchester Cathedral in England, there are two flagstones dedicated to members of the Littlehales family on the floor. The inscription on the stone dedicated to Captain Littlehales confirms that he "died in Camp at Ballarat and was there buried" at the age of 31. Blake estimates that the total military casualties are more likely to have been around 30 as those suffering from slight injuries were unreported.

There are no recorded casualties among the Victorian police officers that took part in the battle.

Peter Lalor's list
Lalor listed fourteen miners (mostly Irish) as having died at the stockade and another eight who died later from injuries they sustained. A further dozen were wounded but recovered. Published by a number of newspapers three months after the battle, his letter to the colonists of Victoria states that:

In the Geelong Advertiser, 8 December edition, readers were told that casualties from the battle were "more numerous than originally supposed." In 1892 the Peter Lalor statue in Ballarat was inscribed with the names of the dead and wounded taken from his open letter along with the words "and others who were killed." Blake makes the unsourced claim that there was at least 21 unidentified dead buried. Superintendent Henry Foster said that "many persons killed whose names were not known, I buried five myself whose names were not known." Captain Thomas estimated that thirty diggers died on the spot, and "many more died of their wounds subsequently." Dan Calwell told his US relations thirty had died. Huyghue reckoned that the battle had claimed thirty to forty lives. On 6 December, Thomas Pierson noted in his diary that twenty-five had been killed and later scrawled in the margin, "time has proved that near 60 have died of the diggers in all." Reverend Taylor initially estimated 100 deaths but reconsidered writing:

Last known survivor
The last known survivor of the battle is believed to be William Edward Atherdon (1838–1936). John Lishman Potter claimed that he was the last, which nobody questioned during his lifetime. However, later research has shown that Potter was aboard the Falcon en route to Melbourne from Liverpool on the day of the battle.

Location of the Eureka Stockade
As the materials used by the rebels to fortify the Eureka lead were quickly removed and the landscape subsequently altered by mining, the exact location of the Eureka Stockade is unknown. In 1870, Ballarat born historian William Withers claimed that:

See also 
 Castle Hill convict rebellion 
 Darwin Rebellion
 Eureka Flag
 Rum Rebellion

Notes

References

Bibliography

Further reading 
 Eurekapedia
 Heretic Press - Ballarat 3rd Dec 1854
 The Eureka Rebellion  Radical nationalist database
 150th Anniversary of the Eureka Stockade - Official site

External links 

 Art Gallery of Ballarat
 Ballarat and District Genealogical Society
 Ballarat Heritage Services
 Ballarat Historical Society
 Ballarat Reform League Inc.
 Eureka Australia
 Eureka Centre Ballarat
 Public Record Office Victoria
 Sovereign Hill/Gold Museum
 State Library of Victoria
 The C.J. La Trobe Society

1854 in Australia
19th-century rebellions
History of Ballarat
Australian folklore
History of Victoria (Australia)
19th century in Victoria (Australia)